The 2005 West Edmonton Mall Grand Prix of Edmonton was the seventh round of the 2005 Bridgestone Presents: the Champ Car World Series Powered by Ford season, held on July 17, 2005 at Finning International Speedway, a temporary course laid out at Edmonton City Centre Airport in Edmonton, Alberta, Canada.  A. J. Allmendinger won the pole, the first of his career, and Sébastien Bourdais was the race winner.

Qualifying results

Race

Caution flags

Notes

 New Track Record A. J. Allmendinger 58.628 (Qualification Session #1)
 New Race Lap Record A. J. Allmendinger 59.900
 New Race Record Sébastien Bourdais 1:38:55.730
 Average Speed 105.302 mph

Championship standings after the race
Drivers' Championship standings

 Note: Only the top five positions are included.

References

External links
 Full Weekend Times & Results
 Friday Qualifying Results
 Saturday Qualifying Results
 Race Box Score

2005 in Champ Car
2
2005 in Canadian motorsport
2005 in Alberta